The 2012–13 Levante season is the 72nd season in club history and their first ever in European competition, where they will enter the playoff round in the UEFA Europa League after finishing 6th in the 2011–12 season.

Competitions

Overall

Pre-season
Kickoff times are in CET.

La Liga

League table

Results summary

Matches
Kickoff times are in CET.

Copa del Rey

Kickoff times are in CET.

UEFA Europa League

Qualifying stage
Kickoff times are in CET.

Group stage

Kickoff times are in CET.

Knockout stage

Squad
.

*Italics denotes no longer with club.

References

Levante UD
Levante UD seasons
Levenate